Thomas Müller (born 5 March 1961, in Aschaffenburg) is a former West German nordic combined skier who competed during the 1980s and early 1990s. He won the Nordic combined 3 x 10 km team event at the 1988 Winter Olympics in Calgary and also won gold medals in the 3 x 10 km team events at the FIS Nordic World Ski Championships in both 1985 and 1987.

Since the 2004/2005 season he has been the head coach of the Nordic Combined at the Oberstdorf Sports School. In 2009, Thomas Müller was voted Coach of the Year in the Nordic Combined.

References

External links 
 

1961 births
Living people
German male Nordic combined skiers
Olympic Nordic combined skiers of West Germany
Nordic combined skiers at the 1984 Winter Olympics
Nordic combined skiers at the 1988 Winter Olympics
Olympic gold medalists for West Germany
Olympic medalists in Nordic combined
People from Aschaffenburg
Sportspeople from Lower Franconia
FIS Nordic World Ski Championships medalists in Nordic combined
Medalists at the 1988 Winter Olympics
Universiade medalists in nordic combined
Universiade gold medalists for West Germany
Competitors at the 1985 Winter Universiade
20th-century German people